James Lee, is a Malaysian film director. He was born Lee Thim Heng in 1973 in the city of Ipoh in Perak. He is one of the pioneers of the Malaysian Digital Film movement. His film The Beautiful Washing Machine won the Best Asean Feature Award and FIPRESCI Prize at the Bangkok International Film Festival 2005. Besides directing, he had also produced the early films of other Malaysian filmmakers, namely, Amir Muhammad and Ho Yuhang, under his production house, Doghouse73 Pictures.

Filmography

Director
Feature-length:

Shorts:

Producer
Feature-length:

Short Films:

Director of Photography

External links

Doghouse73 Pictures
Da Huang Pictures

1973 births
Living people
Malaysian people of Chinese descent
Malaysian cinematographers
Malaysian film directors
Malaysian film producers